Virgil Glenn Coffee (born January 20, 1967) is an American lawyer and Republican politician from the U.S. state of Oklahoma. Coffee was the 30th Oklahoma Secretary of State, having been appointed by Governor Mary Fallin. He served from January 10, 2011 until he resigned effective February 1, 2013.  He was the first Republican President Pro Tempore, having previously served as a Co-President Pro Tempore during the previous legislature.

One of Coffee's most notable achievements was the passage of a comprehensive lawsuit reform measure in Oklahoma, signed into law in May 2009.

Early life and career
Coffee was born in Lubbock, Texas on January 20, 1967, and moved to Oklahoma City. He graduated from Northeastern State University in Tahlequah, Oklahoma in 1988 with a bachelor's degree in political science before attending the University of Oklahoma College of Law, where he earned a Juris Doctor.

Coffee joined the Oklahoma law firm Phillips Murrah, P.C., and continued his private practice during his time at the Oklahoma Legislature.

Political career

Oklahoma Senate
First elected to the Oklahoma Senate in 1998, Coffee was re-elected to without opposition in 2006. Coffee served as one of two Co-President Pro Tempores of the Oklahoma Senate during the 2007 and 2008 legislative sessions and 41st President Pro Tempore for a one-month term because of a tied Senate membership.

After the 2008 elections gave the Republican caucus of the Oklahoma Senate outright control of the chamber on November 4, 2008, the caucus elected Coffee as the President Pro Tempore on November 6, 2008. He was the first Republican in state history to serve in the position. One of his most notable achievements as President Pro Tempore was the passage of a comprehensive lawsuit reform measure in Oklahoma, signed into law in May 2009.

Fallin Administration
Due to term limits placed on him by the Oklahoma Constitution, Coffee was unable to seek re-election in 2010. However, following the election of Mary Fallin as Governor of Oklahoma in November 2010, Coffee was named as the Co-Chairman of her Transition Committee. On January 4, 2011, Fallin named Coffee as her Secretary of State. As Secretary of State, Coffee represented the governor in budgetary and legislative discussions between the executive branch and the Oklahoma Legislature.  Coffee resigned in December, 2012 with an effective date of February 1, 2013 to return to private law practice.

See also
 51st Oklahoma Legislature
 52nd Oklahoma Legislature
 Oklahoma Republican Party

References

External links
 Homepage of the Oklahoma State Senate

|-

|-

1967 births
21st-century American politicians
Heads of Oklahoma state agencies
Lawyers from Oklahoma City
Living people
Northeastern State University alumni
Oklahoma lawyers
Republican Party Oklahoma state senators
Politicians from Oklahoma City
Secretaries of State of Oklahoma
University of Oklahoma College of Law alumni